Adolfo Enrique Hernández Sotelo (born 28 September 1997) is a Mexican professional footballer who plays as a forward for UNAM.

References

External links
 
 
Adolfo Hernández at Football Database EU

Living people
1997 births
Mexican footballers
Association football forwards
Club Universidad Nacional footballers
Liga MX players
Liga Premier de México players
Tercera División de México players
Footballers from Mexico City
Rio Grande Valley FC Toros players